Kumkum Bhagya is an Indian Hindi-language drama television series produced by Ekta Kapoor under Balaji Telefilms. It premiered on 15 April 2014 on Zee TV and it is digitally available on ZEE5. It formerly starred Sriti Jha and Shabir Ahluwalia. Currently, it stars Mugdha Chaphekar and Krishna Kaul as the second generation leads. 

The concept of the show was originally based on Jane Austen's 1811 novel Sense and Sensibility. The show was rebranded as Kumkum Bhagya: Doosri Peedhi in 2019 with a new generation appearing.

Plot 
Rockstar Abhishek "Abhi" Mehra's grandmother asks Pragya's hand in marriage for Abhi from Sarla. Abhi's sister, Alia is in love with his friend, Purab, while he is in love with Pragya's sister Bulbul. Alia comes to know that there is already a woman in Purab's life and informs Abhi. Unfortunately, Alia mistakes Pragya to be the woman and Abhi unwillingly marries her, just to unite Purab and Alia. 

After marriage, Pragya is devastated to know the truth of her marriage and learns the fact that Abhi already has a girlfriend named Tanushree "Tanu", who is Alia's friend. Soon it's revealed that Bulbul is the woman whom Purab loves. After a series of events, Abhi gets Bulbul and Purab married, angering Alia. Unfortunately, Bulbul, sadly dies trying to save Pragya, because of a scheme played by Alia. After a series of events and schemes played by Alia and Tanu, Abhi and Pragya fall in love. Later, Purab meets Disha, they fall in love and marry. Abhi and Pragya's married life continues with several challenges. Abhi blames Pragya for his grandmother's death and they get separated, but unknown to both of them, she is pregnant with their baby at that time.

7 years later

Pragya now has a daughter with Abhi named Kiara. She is living with King Singh, a famous rapper in London, who has one sided romantic feelings for her. Purab and Disha also have a son, Sunny. Later, she comes back to Delhi and after a series of events, Abhi and Pragya reconcile. Pragya gets pregnant again and she gives birth to fraternal twin girls. Kiara is killed by Tanu's ex-boyfriend, Nikhil. King Singh returns back to London. Pragya and Abhi are heartbroken and blame each other for Kiara's death and separate, with Pragya taking the elder twin while Abhi keeps the younger one.

20 years later

Pragya and Abhi's twins, Prachi and Rhea have now grown up. Pragya resides in Hoshiarpur with her daughter Prachi, Beeji (a stranger who took Pragya and Prachi in) and Beeji’s granddaughter, Shahana. A love triangle is formed between Prachi, Rhea and Abhi's friend's son, Ranbir Kohli who is the college heartthrob. Prachi is the replica of Pragya who is sweet, caring and honest  whereas Rhea turns out to be selfish, cunning and over pampered by her aunt Alia. Later, Ranbir and Prachi fall in love. Purab and Disha are revealed to have separated after a misunderstanding created by Alia who has always been obsessed with Purab.

Purab and Alia are married and have a son, Aryan. Abhi and Pragya finally reunite with their daughters. Tanu returns and later marries Abhi who was supposed to be marrying Pragya. Due to a misunderstanding, Abhi cuts ties with Pragya. Prachi and Ranbir get married secretly with only Pragya’s blessings. The Kohlis disown the newly married couple. Pragya gets into an accident and is presumed to be dead.

2 years later

Pragya survives and comes back from Australia with the intention of taking revenge from Abhi as she was tricked into thinking that Abhi was the one who tried to kill her by Tanu and Alia. Prachi and Ranbir's happily married life continues and they soon get accepted back in the Kohli mansion. Rhea gets married to Siddharth,  Ranbir's elder cousin brother. Purab finally cuts ties and divorces Alia. Abhi and Pragya clear their misunderstandings and reunite. They meet with an accident and fall into a coma. Ranbir accuses Prachi of extramarital affair with Siddharth due to a misunderstanding created by Rhea and they get separated. 

1 month later

Sid and Rhea are now divorced. Ranbir turns out to be a successful businessman whereas Sushma who is Pragya's mentor tries to console a heartbroken Prachi. Prachi decides to move on and focus on her career with Sushma's help but gets to know that she is pregnant with Ranbir's child. However, Rhea and Ranbir get married due to Rhea’s fake suicide drama and Ranbir thinks Prachi has moved on. However, their marriage is invalid. Prachi witnesses their wedding and decides to fight for her self-esteem. For this she returns to the Kohli House to regain her right as Ranbir's legal wife and to throw Rhea out.

Prachi finally succeeds in her mission and Ranbir marries her for a second time. Rhea and Alia are exposed and thrown out of Kohli house, and Ranbir and Rhea divorce. Rhea apologies for her past actions, and Alia kills Abhi and Pragya in their coma. Alia is punished for her crimes and is sent for 14 years imprisonment. Prachi gives birth to a baby girl, Panchi. Alia runs away from prison and later kidnaps Panchi for revenge. She accidentally throws her in river and  Panchi is presumed to be dead. Ranbir and Prachi blame each other for their daughter's death and separate. Prachi meets with an accident and is assumed to be dead.

6 years later

Prachi and Panchi are revealed to be alive, which the Kohlis aren’t aware of. Prachi now lives in Bangalore and leads a happy life with Baljeet Dadi and Shahana. She has become a strict businesswoman working as a manager in a renowned company. The Kohlis however, are now on the verge of bankruptcy. Prachi and Ranbir constantly miss Panchi. On the other hand, Panchi, renamed Khushi, is now adopted by a women named Laali and leads a difficult life selling flowers at street for a living. Ranbir now works at a company which is owned by a businessman while it is operated by his daughter named Kaaya Malhotra who develops a liking towards Ranbir unaware that he is married.

Prachi comes to Delhi, and meets Kaaya and develops a friendship with her unaware that Prachi is Ranbir's wife. Ranbir and Prachi meets Khushi unaware that Khushi is their long lost daughter Panchi and they develop a close bond with her. Prachi and Ranbir finally meet, but Prachi still holds a grudge. Akshay, who is the son of Prachi's boss Ashok Tandon, and a friend of hers who supported her in these 6 years, completes his studies in London and returns to India, and it is revealed he is in love with Prachi.

Cast

Main

 Sriti Jha as Pragya Arora Mehra: Sarla and Raghuveer's eldest daughter; Preeta, Bulbul and Srishti's elder sister; Abhishek's wife; Kiara, Prachi and Rhea's mother; Panchi’s maternal grandmother (2014–2021) (Dead)
 Shabir Ahluwalia as Abhishek "Abhi" Prem Mehra: Santoshi and Prem's son; Pragya's husband; Tanu's ex-boyfriend and ex-husband; Alia's brother; Kiara, Prachi and Rhea's father; Panchi's maternal grandfather (2014–2021) (Dead)
 Mugdha Chaphekar as Prachi Arora Kohli (also Prachi Mehra): Pragya and Abhi's second daughter; Kiara's younger and Rhea's twin sister; Ranbir's wife; Panchi's mother (2019–present)
 Krishna Kaul as Ranbir Kohli: Pallavi and Vikram's son; Mishti's brother; Prachi's husband; Rhea’s ex-fiancé; Panchi's father (2019–present)

Recurring
 Mehul Kajaria / Rushad Rana as Vikram Kohli: Daljeet's son; Pallavi's husband; Ranbir and Mishti's father; Siddharth's uncle/adoptive father; Vikrant and Arun's brother; Abhi's friend and business partner; Panchi's paternal grandfather (2019–2021/2021–present)
 Khyaati Keswani as Pallavi Kohli: Vikram's wife; Ranbir and Mishti's mother; Sid's aunt/adoptive mother; Panchi's paternal grandmother (2019–present)
Kiran Bhargava/Smita Shetty as Daljeet “Dida” Kohli: Vikram, Vikrant and Arun's mother; Ranbir, Mishti, Sid and Mihika’s grandmother (2019–2022)/(2022–present)
 Farida Dadi as Baljeet Dadi: Abhishek, Raj, Akash and Alia's grand-aunt; Daljeet's sister-in-law; Bunty, Neha, Bittu, Sunny, Kiara, Prachi, Rhea and Aryan's great grand-aunt (2020–2021/2023–present)
 Trisha Rohatgi as Panchi "Khushi" Kohli: Ranbir and Prachi’s daughter; Vikram, Pallavi, Abhi and Pragya's grand-daughter. (2023–present)
 Aalisha Panwar as Kaaya Malhotra: Ranbir’s obsessive one sided lover (2023–present)
 Abhishek Malik as Akshay Tandon: Ashok’s son; Prachi’s friend and love interest (2023–present)
 Zeeshan Khan/Pulkit Bangia as Aryan Khanna: Alia and Purab's son; Sunny's half-brother; Bunty, Neha, Bittu, Kiara, Prachi and Rhea's cousin brother; Ranbir's best friend; Mili's ex-boyfriend; Shahana’s love interest (2019–2022)/(2022–present)
 Aparna Mishra as Shahana Sharma: Beeji’s granddaughter; Pragya’s niece-figure; Prachi's best friend and sister-figure; Aryan’s love interest (2019–present)
Kaushal Kapoor as Ashok Tandon: Prachi's boss; Akshay’s father (2023–present)
Vishal Solanki as Satinder: Prachi's rival colleague (2023–present)
 Pallavi Mahara as Damini: Aryan’s suitress (2023–present)
 Sharika Ahluwalia as Laali: A poor, greedy woman who raised Panchi (2023–present)
 Zessica Harrison as Priya: Prachi’s assistant (2023–present)
 Shikha Singh as Alia Mehra (formerly Khanna): Santoshi and Prem's daughter; Abhi's younger sister; Raj and Aakash's cousin; Purab's third ex-wife; Aryan's mother (2014–2020)
 Reyhna Malhotra replaced Singh as Alia (2020–2023)
 Madhurima Tuli as Tanushree "Tanu" Mehta: Alia's best friend; Abhi's ex-wife; Nikhil's girlfriend. (2014)
 Leena Jumani replaced Tuli as Tanushree (2014–2019, 2021)
 Naina Singh as Rhea Mehra (formerly Kohli): Pragya and Abhi's youngest daughter; Kiara' and Prachi's younger sister; Siddharth's ex-wife; Ranbir’s ex-fiancée (2019–2020)
 Pooja Banerjee replaced Singh as Rhea (2020–2022)
 Tina Philip replaced Banerjee as Rhea (2022–2023)
 Arjit Taneja/Vin Rana as Purab Khanna: Abhi's best friend, business partner and brother-figure; Bulbul's widower; Disha and Alia’s ex-husband; Sunny and Aryan's father (2014–2016) / (2016–2021)
 Mrunal Thakur as Bulbul Arora Khanna: Sarla and Raghuveer's third daughter; Pragya, Preeta and Srishti's sister; Purab's first wife; murdered by Alia.(2014–2016)
 Ruchi Savarn as Disha Singh Khanna: Purab's second wife; Sunny's mother (2017–2019)
 Supriya Shukla as Sarla Arora: Raghuveer's widow; Pragya, Preeta, Bulbul and Srishti's mother; Kiara, Prachi, Rhea's grandmother; Pihu's adoptive grandmother (2014–2018)
 Madhu Raja as Daljeet Kaur Arora: Raghuveer's mother; Pragya, Preeta, Bulbul and Srishti's grandmother (2014–2018)
 Jasjeet Babbar as Janki: The Aroras' handmaiden; Poorvi's mother (2014–2018)
 Daljeet Soundh as Daljeet Kaur Mehra: Abhi, Alia, Raj and Akash's grandmother; Swarni and Indu's elder sister; Ajay and Prem's mother; Bunty, Neha, Bittu, Kiara, Prachi and Rhea's paternal great-grandmother; Aryan's maternal great-grandmother. She belongs to a Punjabi Sikh family and moved to Mumbai with Abhi and Alia after Prem and Santoshi's death.[killed by Simonica](2014–2018)
 Zarina Khan as 'Indu Dasi' aka Inderjit Kaur Suri: Abhi, Alia, Raj and Akash's grand-aunt; Daljeet and Swarni's younger sister; Ajay and Prem's aunt; Bunty, Neha, Bittu, Kiara, Sunny, Prachi, Rhea and Aryan's great grand-aunt. She started living with her sister Daljeet after the death of Daljeet's younger son (Prem). (2014–2020)
 Radha Israni/Asha Sharma as Swarni Dasi: Abhi, Alia, Raj and Akash's grand-aunt; Daljeet and Indu's sister. (2014–2018)/(2018–2020)
 Shivaani Sopuri as Parminder Kaur Mehra ("Pammi Mehra"): Ajay's wife; Raj and Akash's mother. Abhishek and Alia's aunt; Bunty, Neha and Bittu's grandmother; Kiara, Sunny, Prachi, Rhea and Aryan's grand-aunt; Daljeet's elder daughter-in-law. (2014–2021)
 Ajay Trehan as Ajay Mehra: Parminder's husband; Raj and Akash's father; Abhishek and Alia's uncle; Prem's elder brother; Bunty, Neha and Bittu's grandfather; Kiara, Sunny, Prachi, Rhea and Aryan's grand-uncle; Daljeet's elder son.(2014–2020)
 Anurag Sharma as Raj Mehra: Parminder and Ajay's son; Akash's brother; Mitali's husband; Bunty and Neha's father; Abishek and Alia's cousin; Bittu, Sunny, Kiara, Prachi, Rhea and Aryan's uncle.(2014–2021)
 Samikssha Batnagar / Swati Anand as Mitali Mehra: Raj's wife; Bunty and Neha's mother; Bittu, Sunny, Kiara, Prachi, Rhea and Aryan's aunt. (2014) / (2014–2021)
 Ankit Mohan as Akash Mehra: Pammi and Ajay's son; Raj's brother; Rachna's husband; Abhishek and Alia's cousin; Bittu's father; Bunty, Neha, Sunny, Kiara, Prachi, Rhea and Aryan's uncle. (2014–2016)
 Aditi Rathore as Rachna Shrivastav Mehra: Suresh's sister; Akash's wife; Bittu's mother; Bunty, Neha, Sunny, Kiara, Prachi, Rhea and Aryan's aunt. (2014–2016)
 Charu Mehra as Poorvi: Janki's daughter; Pragya and Bulbul's namesake sister (2014–2015)
 Faisal Rashid as Suresh Shrivastav: Rachna's brother; Pragya's ex-fiancé (2014–2015)
 Neel Motwani as Corporator Neil Thakur (2014–2015)
 Haelyn Shastri as News Reporter (2015)
 Nikhil Arya / Rajat Dahiya / Shaad Randhawa as Nikhil Sood: Tanu's ex-lover (2015–2017) / (2017–2018) / (2018–2019)
 Bobby Khanna as Mr. Mehta: Tanu's father (2015–2017)
 Roma Lavani as Mrs. Mehta: Tanu's mother (2015–2018)
 Pratik Parihar as Manohar: Abhi's accountant who schemed against Pragya (2016)
 Vijay Kashyap as Raghuveer Arora: Daljeet's son; Sarla's husband; Pragya, Preeta, Bulbul and Srishti's father; Kiara, Prachi, Rhea's grandfather (2017)
 Nitin Goswami as Dushyant Rana: Simonica's husband who was accidentally killed by Abhishek (2017–2018)
 Sharhaan Singh as Sangram Singh Chautala: Disha's ex-fiancé (2017–2018)
 Vivana Singh as Simonica Dushyant Rana: Dushyant's widow (2017–2018)
 Shwetanshu Singh as Dr. Sheila (2017)
 Mishal Raheja as King Singh: A rapper based in the UK; Pragya's former boss and one-sided lover (2018–2019)
 Kaurwakee Vasistha as Kiara Mehra (Arora): Abhi and Pragya's eldest daughter; Prachi and Rhea's elder sister [Deceased] (2018–2019)
 Vedaansh Jaju as Sunny Khanna: Purab and Disha's son; Aryan's half-brother; Bunty, Neha, Bittu, Kiara, Prachi and Rhea’s cousin brother (2018–2019)
 Abeer Adil as Tarun: King's cousin; Neha's husband (2018–2019)
 Richa Rathore as Neha "Babli" Mehra: Mitali and Raj's daughter; Abhi, Akash and Alia's niece; Bunty's sister; Bittu, Sunny, Kiara, Prachi, Rhea and Aryan's coisin sister; Tarun's wife. (2018)
 Roma Bali as Tarun's mother: King's aunt (2018–2019)
 Jaanvi Sangwan as Beeji: A nurse who took Pragya in after the latter's exile, Shahana's paternal grandmother (2019)
 Ashlesha Sawant as Meera: Rhea's foster mother and Abhi's ex-fiancé (2019–2021)
 Manmohan Tiwari as Rohit "Sanju" Gill: A local gangster of Hoshiarpur; Prachi's obsessive one-sided lover (2019–2020)
 Ashwini Tobe as Dimpy: Rhea's friend (2019–2020)
 Shivali Choudhry as Shaina: Rhea's friend (2019–2020)
 Pooja Singh as Mishti Kohli: Vikram and Pallavi's daughter; Ranbir's sister (2019)
 Neena Cheema / Rupa Divetia as Sarita Ben: A Gujarati woman who gave refuge to Pragya and her daughters after they left Hoshiarpur for Delhi; Rishi's maternal grandmother (2019–2020; 2020–2021)
 Sonali Joshi as Chief Minister Vasudha (2019)
 Ribbhu Mehra as Ritik: Disha's friend and secret lover (2019)
 Gautam Nain as Rishi Dhaval: Sarita's grandson; Prachi and Shahana's friend; Purab's employee (2019)
 Kajal Chauhan as Priyanka Rane: Abhi's friend's daughter, Rishi's obsessive lover (2019)
 Rose Khan as Maya Choubey, Ranbir's ex-fiancée (2020)
 Manish Khanna as Dushyant Singh Chaubey, Maya's uncle (2020)
 Bhupendra Khuranna as Mr. Choubey, Maya's father, Dushyant's younger brother (2020)
 Anuradha Sharma as Mrs. Choubey, Maya's mother (2020)
 Naina Yadav as Palak: Prachi and Shahana's friend (2021)
 Sharukh Firoz Khan as Sharp Shooter (2021)
 Gagan Anand as Digvijay: Abhishek's business rival (2021)
 Gazala Silawat as Pari: Rhea's friend (2021)
 Rohit Choudhary as Pradeep Khurana: Tanu's ex-husband (2021)
 Dolly Sohi as Sushma Tandon: A rich businesswoman and Pragya's mentor (2021)
 Vineet Kumar Chaudhary as Gautam Thapar: A businessman; Sushma and Pragya's business partner; Pragya's one-sided lover (2021)
 Jatin Shah as Gaurav Thapar: Gautam's elder brother (2021)
 Shamikh Abbas as Arun Kohli: Daljeet's youngest son; Vikram and Vikrant’s younger brother; Ranbir, Mishti and Sid's paternal uncle; Teji's husband (2021)
Mridula Oberoi as Teji Kohli: Arun's wife; Ranbir, Mishti and Sid's aunt (2021)
 Abhishek Kumaarr as Jai Bhatt: Ranbir's best friend (2021–2022)
 Gulshan Shivani as Stanley: Ranbir's assistant (2022)
 Kushagra Nautiyal as Siddharth "Sid" Kohli: Vikrant's son; Pallavi and Vikram's nephew and adopted son; Mihika’s brother; Ranbir and Mishti's elder cousin brother; Rhea's ex-husband (2021–2023)
 Aishana Singh as Mihika Kohli: Sid’s younger sister; Vikram and Pallavi’s niece; Ranbir and Mishti’s cousin sister (2022–2023)
 Veronica Talreja as Mili: Aryan's ex-girlfriend and friend (2022)

Kumkum Bhagya Saavan Mahotsav
 Vishal Singh as Rahul: Abhishek and Poorab's friend; Anjali's husband (2018)
 Rhea Sharma as Anjali: Abhishek and Poorab's friend; Rahul's wife (2018)
 Yuvika Choudhary as Tina: Rahul's former fiancé (2018)
 Kavita Ghai as Rahul's mother (2018)
 Rakesh Kukreti as Rahul's father (2018)

Cameo appearances
 Shraddha Arya as Dr. Preeta Arora: Pragya, Bulbul and Srishti's sister; Karan's wife (2017–2018)
 Anjum Fakih as Srishti Arora: Pragya, Preeta and Bulbul's sister (2017–2018)
 Dheeraj Dhoopar as Karan Luthra: Abhi's friend;  Preeta's husband (2017–2018)
 Manit Joura as Rishabh Luthra: Abhi's friend, Karan's elder brother (2017–2018)
 Vijay Kashyap as Raghuveer Arora: Daljeet's son; Sarla's husband; Pragya, Preeta, Bulbul and Shristi's father; Kiara, Prachi, Rhea's grandfather (2017)

Guest appearances

 Shraddha Kapoor and Sidharth Malhotra to promote Ek Villain (2014)
 Samrat (Mohit Malik) & Urmi (Neha Marda) from Doli Armaano Ki, Rachna (Mahima Makwana) & K.T (Piyush Sahdev) from Sapne Suhane Ladakpan Ke and Kamlaben (Shilpa Shirodkar) from Ek Mutthi Aasmaan as guests in Abhi-Pragya wedding reception (2014)
 Arjun (Rithvik Dhanjani) and Poorvi (Asha Negi) from Pavitra Rishta (2015)
 Pratyusha Banerjee, Shweta Tiwari, Kamla (Rinku Karmarkar) & Kartik (Ankush Arora) from Yeh Vaada Raha, Siddharth (Ravi Dubey) & Roshni (Nia Sharma) from Jamai Raja, Mouni Roy & Karishma Tanna, Rithvik Dhanjani Karanvir Bohra & Neil Bhatt, Yuvi (Zain Imam) Twinkle (Jasmin Bhasin) & Kunj (Sidhant Gupta) from Tashan-e-Ishq and Jeetendra to celebrate Deva Shree Ganesha Utsav (2015) 
 Salman Khan and Sonam Kapoor to promote Prem Ratan Dhan Payo (2015)
 Survi (Sonal Vengurlekar) from  Yeh Vaada Raha and Twinkle (Jasmin Bhasin) from Tashan-e-Ishq (2015)
 Shah Rukh Khan, Kajol, Varun Dhawan and Kriti Sanon to promote Dilwale (2015)
 Survi (Sonal Vengurlekar) and Kartik (Ankush Arora) from Yeh Vaada Raha (2015)
 Leela (Vaishnavi Macdonald) and Twinkle (Jasmin Bhasin) from Tashan-e-Ishq (2016)
 Siddharth (Ravi Dubey) & Roshni (Nia Sharma) from Jamai Raja, Bhagwandas (Rajesh Kumar) & Vindhwasni (Disha Savla) from Neeli Chatri Waale, Aditya Narayan, Mahi (Shritama Mukherjee) Yuvraj (Zain Imam) Twinkle (Jasmin Bhasin) & Kunj (Sidhant Gupta) from Tashan-e-Ishq, Gauri (Fenil Umrigar) Yug (Rohan Gandotra) & Kaali (Simran Pareenja) from Kaala Teeka, Malay (Vin Rana) from Vishkanya Ek Anokhi Prem Kahani, Mouni Roy & Rithvik Dhanjani, Swasti Nitya Kartikey Raj & Preetjyot Singh from India's Best Dramebaaz, Vrushika Mehta, Sanam (Surbhi Jyoti) & Aahil (Karanvir Bohra) from Qubool  Hai, Pari (Hiba Nawab) & Satyendra (Pearl V Puri) from Meri Saasu Maa and Survi (Sonal Vengurlekar) & Kartik (Ankush Arora) from Yeh Vaada Raha to celebrate Holi Ke Rang (2016)
 Nargis Fakhri, Emraan Hashmi and Prachi Desai to promote Azhar (2016)
 Krystle D'Souza to promote Brahmarakshas (2016)
 Devoleena Bhattacharjee as Gopi from Saath Nibhana Saathiya (2016)
 Riteish Deshmukh
 Rani Mukerjee
 Irrfan Khan
 Sridevi
 Rakul Preet Singh
 Tusshar Kapoor
 Aftab Shivdasani
 Sushant Singh Rajput to promote MS Dhoni:The Untold Story(2016)
 Shubham Choudhury
 Asha Negi
 Nia Sharma
 Disha Parmar
 Arjun Kapoor
 Dipika Kakar
 Ram (Ankit Siwach) Siya (Garima Singh Rathore) & Mohini (Reyhna Pandit) from Manmohini, Shantanu (Avinash Mishra) & Asmita (Vrushika Mehta) from Yeh Teri Galiyan, Amruta Khanvilkar & Debina Bonnerjee, Karan (Dheeraj Dhoopar) Preeta (Shraddha Arya) Sameer (Abhishek Kapur) Srishti (Anjum Fakih) Rishabh (Manit Joura) & Sherlyn (Ruhi Chaturvedi) from Kundali Bhagya, Guddan (Kanika Mann) & Akshat (Nishant Singh Malkani) from Guddan Tumse Na Ho Payega, Shoaib Ibrahim & Karan Tacker and Karishma Tanna to celebrate Pyaar Ka Jashn (2019)
 Ayushmann Khurrana, Nushrat Bharucha, Jeetendra, I am hip hop, Surbhi Jyoti, Randhir (Param Singh) & Anshul (Ankit Mohan) from Haiwaan, Shamita Shetty, Karan (Dheeraj Dhoopar) & Preeta (Shraddha Arya) from Kundali Bhagya, Rithvik Dhanjani, Deepika Singh & Karan Wahi to celebrate Lambodaray Janm Utsav (2019)
 Nandita (Sakshi Tanwar) and Meghan (Palomi Ghosh) to Promote Mission Over Mars (2019)
 Guddi (Ali Asgar) to promote Movie Masti With Maniesh Paul (2019)
 Taapsee Pannu and Bhumi Pednekar to promote Saand Ki Aankh (2019)
 Amrita (Anushka Ranjan) and Tarini (Krystle D'Souza) to promote Fittrat (2019)
 Sameera (Harleen Sethi) and Veer (Vikrant Massey) to promote (Broken But Beautiful) season 2 (2019)
 Taapsee Pannu to promote Thappad (2020)
 Kalyani (Reem Shaikh) and Malhar (Sehban Azim) from Tujhse Hai Raabta (2020)
 Rani Kuranj Rajawat (Anushka Sen) to promote Apna Time Bhi Aayega (2020)
 Bhaskar Shetty (Angad Bedi) to promote Mum Bhai (2020)
 Surbhi Jyoti, Karan (Dheeraj Dhoopar) Preeta (Shraddha Arya) Srishti (Anjum Fakih) & Rishabh (Manit Joura) from Kundali Bhagya, Deepika Singh, Krystle D'Souza, V Unbeatable & Dipali Borkar, Agastya (Savi Thakur) & Guddan (Kanika Mann) from Guddan Tumse Na Ho Payega and Shantanu (Avinash Mishra) & Asmita (Vrushika Mehta) from Yeh Teri Galiyan to celebrate Jashna Milan Ka - Diwali (2020) 
 Lakshmi Bajwa (Aishwarya Khare) to promote Bhagya Lakshmi (2021)
 Diya Mukherjee (Aanchal Goswami) to promote Rishton Ka Manjha (2021)
 Shoaib Ibrahim & Megha Ray, Adaa Khan & Karan Wahi, Karan (Dheeraj Dhoopar) & Preeta (Shraddha Arya), Kanika Mann & Vrushika Mehta, Rishabh (Manit Joura) & Nishant Singh Malkani, Lakshmi (Aishwarya Khare) & Rishi (Rohit Suchanti) and Deepika Singh & Ayush (Aman Gandhi) to celebrate Pyaar Waali Holi(2022)
 Lakshmi (Aishwarya Khare), Rishi (Rohit Suchanti), Ayush (Aman Gandhi), Malishka (Maera Mishra) and Balwinder (Ankit Bhatia) from Bhagya Lakshmi for Holi Mahasangam (2022)
 Radha (Neeharika Roy) to promote Pyar Ka Pehla Naam: Radha Mohan (2022)
 Kajol to promote Salaam Venky (2022)

Production

Development

The series is a love story produced by Ekta Kapoor and Shobha Kapoor under the banner Balaji Telefilms that airs on Zee TV. Ekta Kapoor considers the letter K to be lucky and has named many of her productions starting with K. Talking about introducing a fresh concept on prime time, Zee TV Programming head Namit Sharma said, "It takes one epic show to replace another, so you can imagine. It is a passionate drama of love, a far cry from regular saas-bahu soaps and has an ensemble cast of some very talented actors." 

Ekta Kapoor added, "While two of my shows (Pavitra Rishta and Jodha Akbar) are already on-air and doing immensely well on Zee TV, it's a pleasure to extend my partnership with Zee to a third show. Pavitra Rishta has had a run of over five years now and the journey has been most gratifying for me as a producer. While the audiences who are hooked on to Pavitra Rishta will continue to enjoy the show at 6:30 PM, Kumkum Bhagya will open at 9 PM, drawing maximum eyeballs. It is so contemporary in its treatment that viewers will be able to instantly spot characters out of their own lives in the show. It's a story of passionate love that anyone with a soul would be able to easily relate to".

Speaking of his comeback as an actor, Shabbir Ahluwalia, the protagonist of the show says, "With me producing shows, it was getting very difficult to manage time for acting assignments. But now, I have decided to concentrate on acting. You cannot be away from what you love doing for long. The role appealed to me a great deal. This is the first time that I will be playing a rockstar on television and in order to look my part, I had to ensure that I did not just get my costume and look right, but also get that attitude right that is required to portray a rockstar onscreen."

Filming
The production and airing of the show was halted indefinitely in late March 2020 due to the COVID-19 outbreak in India. The outbreak caused the halt of filming of television shows and movies on 19 March 2020, and they were expected to resume on 1 April 2020. But shooting remained suspended and the remaining episodes were aired up to 24 March 2020. After three months, the production and filming of the series resumed on 29 June 2020 and airing resumed on 13 July 2020.

Casting
Shabbir Ahluwalia, who was also cast in Ekta's TV series Kayamath, was selected to portray the lead role of Abhishek Prem Mehra. Ahluwalia made his comeback after Zee twenty years. Actress Sriti Jha landed in lead role in the show. Mrunal Thakur was selected to portray the second leading role of Bulbul while Arjit Taneja was cast opposite her. In May 2014, Shikha Singh entered the show as the main antagonist Alia Mehra, while Madhurima Tuli was cast to portray the negative role of Tanu. Later, Tuli had to shoot for her film Baby so, this role was later played by Leena Jumani in September 2014. Actor Faisal Rashid was selected to portray the role of Suresh (Pragya's fiancé) who played an important role in April–May 2014, but in May 2015 he quit the series. Actress Supriya Shukla was cast to play the role of Sarla Arora, while Madhu Raja played the role of Daljeet Arora. Other supporting cast members include Samikssha Batnagar, Ankit Mohan, Charu Mehra and Amit Dhawan. Bhatnagar, who portrayed the supporting role of Mitali was replaced by Swati Anand within the month of launch while Anurag Sharma replaced Amit. In 2015, Neel Motawani (who was also cast in other shows of Ekta) was selected to play the negative role of Neel; while in June 2015 Nikhil Arya entered the series playing the role of main male antagonist Nikhil Sood.

In December 2015, Mrunal Thakur opted out from the show and was to be replaced by Kajol Shrivastava, however the character of Bulbul was phased out of the series after Mrunal's departure. In August 2016, Ankit Mohan quit the show so his character left as well. In September 2016, Arjit Taneja quit the show and was replaced by Vin Rana. In October 2016, Nikhil Arya was replaced by Rujut Dahiya. In July 2017, actress Ruchi Savarn entered the show as Purab's new love interest. Mishal Raheja as King Singh and Kaurwakee Vashista as Kiara Mehra entered the show after the leap. Actor Abeer Adil was cast in 2018 as King's cousin Tarun and Roma Bali as Tarun's mother.

In March 2019, a twenty-year leap was introduced which several new characters entered in the show and became pivotal characters. In March 2019, Mugdha Chaphekar, Krishna Kaul and Naina Singh were introduced as leads of the second generation who play Prachi, Ranbir and Rhea respectively alongside Sriti and Shabbir. In August 2020, Naina left the show as she wasn't happy playing a negative role anymore and Pooja Banerjee replaced Singh as Rhea. In February 2022, Pooja Banerjee quit the show because she is in the last month of her pregnancy and her due date is March, and she was replaced by Tina Ann Philip.

Distribution

The series was released on 15 April 2014 on Zee TV. The series also airs on Zee TV HD and Zee TV Asia.

Spin-off

Kundali Bhagya 

A spin-off series Kundali Bhagya premiered on 12 July 2017. The series narrates the story of Pragya's two sisters, Preeta and Srishti and their attempt to find their mother Sarla and how they meet the rich and famous Luthra family. The show stars Supriya Shukla, Shraddha Arya, Dheeraj Dhoopar, Anjum Fakih and Shakti Arora.

Bhagya Lakshmi

A similar series Bhagya Lakshmi  premiered on 3 August 2021. It traces the love story of Lakshmi and Rishi. It stars Aishwarya Khare and Rohit Suchanti.

Reception

Critical reception 

The show climbed to Top 5 most-watched shows across all GECs, after only a few weeks of its launch. It was touted as the biggest fiction launch of 2014. The serial is very popular among Indian women. The show also gave tough fight to the long-time Hindi GEC leader Diya Aur Baati Hum that aired at same slot on Star Plus.

Reruns of Kumkum Bhagya premiered on Zee Anmol from 2017 and received high ratings in the BARC rural chart when Zee Anmol was FTA. It began running on the network again from episode 1 from 10 June 2020, due to the return to DD Free Dish.

Awards and nominations

Soundtrack
The Kumkun Bhagya Soundtrack was written by Nawab Arzoo and composed by Lalit Sen. Lalit Sen had composed the original songs and background score for the show. "Allah Waariyan" is not the song of this show but it was the theme song of Abhi and Pragya. The first original song of the show is "O Rabba Ki Karaan", audience loved the song. The sad version of this song are also released with the title "Tum Ko Mera Dard Dikhna" and "Har Ke Bhi Jitna Hai Pyaar" sung by Kashi Malik. Meherbaanon Ka Shukriya Song was released on the occasion of completing 1000 episodes and for thanking the audience for the love and support.

References

External links

 
Official website

 
2014 Indian television series debuts
Balaji Telefilms television series
Hindi-language television shows
Indian drama television series
Indian television soap operas
Television shows set in Mumbai
Zee TV original programming
Television shows set in Delhi